Niccolò Schirò (born 25 March 1994) is an Italian racing driver, who is best known for being the 2012 European F3 Open champion.

Career

Karting
Born in Milan, Schirò began karting in 2007 and raced both in his native Italy and Europe for the majority of his karting career, working his way up from the junior ranks to progress through to the KF2 category a year later, when he finished 28th in the European KF2 Championship.

Formula Abarth
In 2010, Schirò graduated to single–seaters into the newly launched Formula Abarth series, competing with Emmebi Motorsport. He only finished five races inside the top twenty placings and finished the season in 29th place.

European F3 Open
Schirò stepped up to the European F3 Open Championship in 2011, joining RP Motorsport. He finished all but one of the season's races in the points, including two second-place finishes at Brands Hatch. This brought him fifth place in the final championship standings.

Schirò remained in the championship in 2012 with the same team. He scored four wins at Le Castellet and Monza and clinched the championship title ahead of teammate Gianmarco Raimondo, having trailed by fifteen points heading into the final weekend in Barcelona.

International GT Open
Schirò made his sports car racing debut in the SGT class of the International GT Open in 2013, racing for Drivex School. He finished fourth in the GTS standings with three class wins.

After competing for the Villorba Corse in the final round at Barcelona, he will continue his partnership with the team in 2014.

Auto GP
Schirò made his Auto GP début in 2014 at Le Castellet, joining Ibiza Racing.

Racing record

Career summary

References

External links
 
 

1994 births
Living people
Racing drivers from Milan
Formula Abarth drivers
Italian Formula Three Championship drivers
Euroformula Open Championship drivers
International GT Open drivers
Auto GP drivers
European Le Mans Series drivers
Drivex drivers
RP Motorsport drivers
Le Mans Cup drivers
Iron Lynx drivers
Ferrari Challenge drivers